Calcium hydroxychloride is the inorganic compound with the formula CaOHCl.  A white solid, it forms by the reaction of hydrogen chloride with calcium hydroxide  According to X-ray crystallography, it adopts a layered structure related to brucite (Mg(OH)2).

Calcium hydroxychloride is sometimes confused with calcium hypochlorite, another name for calcium hydroxychloride refers to a mixed crystal of a calcium salt containing hydroxide and chloride anions. 

Calcium hydroxychloride may form on concrete roads and bridges as a consequence of the use of calcium chloride as s deicing agent. Calcium chloride reacts with calcium hydroxide (portlandite) present in cement hydration products and forms a deleterious expanding phase also named CAOXY (abbreviation for calcium oxychloride) by concrete technologists. The stress induced into concrete by crystallisation pressure and CAOXY salt expansion can considerably reduce the strength of concrete.

References

Calcium compounds